You Live and Learn is a 1937 comedy film directed by Arthur B. Woods and starring Glenda Farrell and Claude Hulbert. The film was a quota quickie production and was based on the novel "Have You Come for Me?" by Norma Patterson. It was released by Warner Bros. in September 1937. The movie is now classed as a lost film.

Plot
American chorus-girl Mamie Wallace (Glenda Farrell) travels to Paris with a ramshackle touring musical revue. The company runs out of money, and it looks as though Mamie and her dancing colleagues are going to be stranded in Europe with no way home. Luckily, she meets a handsome, well-spoken Englishman Peter Millett (Claude Hulbert), who falls in love with her and proposes marriage. Under the impression that he is a man of means, she readily accepts, imagining an entrée to English high society.

The couple return to England, and Mamie discovers to her horror that not only is her new home a decrepit farmhouse out in the sticks, but that Peter is a widower and his three children also come as part of the package. Despite her disappointment, she shows her pluck and spirit by determining not to run away but to stay and make the best of things. However the local villagers are shocked by her city ways and appearance and make it difficult for her to fit in. An additional difficulty reveals itself in the person of local schoolteacher Dot Harris, who has long had an eye on Peter for herself and is now consumed with jealousy and spite, going out of her way to cause trouble for Mamie at every opportunity. However Mamie's good nature and decency are gradually acknowledged, and she triumphs in the end.

Cast
 Glenda Farrell as Mamie Wallace
 Claude Hulbert as Peter Millett
 Glen Alyn as Dot Harris
 John Carol as George
 James Stephenson as Sam Brooks
 Arthur Finn as Joseph P. Munro
 George Galleon as Lord Haverstock
 Wallace Evennett as Amos Biddle
 Margaret Yarde as Mrs. Biddle

References

External links 

1937 films
1937 comedy films
Films directed by Arthur B. Woods
Lost British films
British black-and-white films
First National Pictures films
British comedy films
Lost comedy films
1937 lost films
1930s English-language films
1930s British films